Russell O. Hickman (February 5, 1908 – November 5, 1988) was an American politician and businessman.

Biography
Born in Showell, Maryland, Hickman owned a small loan business. From 1955 to 1979, he served in the Maryland House of Delegates as a Democrat, first representing Worcester County, then district 36. He died in Berlin, Maryland on November 5, 1988, at the age of 80.

Notes

1908 births
1988 deaths
People from Worcester County, Maryland
Businesspeople from Maryland
Democratic Party members of the Maryland House of Delegates